Peter Carey (born 30 April 1948 in Rangoon) is a British historian and author who specialises in the modern history of Indonesia, Java in particular, and has also written on East Timor and Myanmar. He was the Laithwaite fellow of Modern History at Trinity College, Oxford, from 1979 to 2008. His major early work concentrated on the history of Diponegoro, the British in Java, 1811–16 and the Java War (1825–30), on which he has published extensively. His biography of Diponegoro, The Power of Prophecy, appeared in 2007, and a succinct version, Destiny; The Life of Prince Diponegoro of Yogyakarta, 1785–1855, was published in 2014. He has conducted research in Lisbon and the United Kingdom amongst the exile East Timorese student community for an oral history of the Indonesian occupation of East Timor, 1975–99, part of which was published in the Cornell University journal Indonesia (no. 76 [October 2003], pp. 23–67).

Carey regularly comments on the history and politics of Southeast Asia to the British media. He is adjunct professor at the Department of Humanities of the University of Indonesia in Jakarta (since 2013), and was previously Indonesia country director of the Cambodia Trust (2008–2012), a UK disability charity that he co-founded in November 1989 to address the needs of mine victims in Cambodia.

Biography
Carey was born to British businessman Thomas Brian Carey and his wife Wendy in Rangoon, Burma — now known as Yangon — on 30 April 1948. At the age of seven he and his family moved to the United Kingdom.

In 1969, Carey passed his BA degree in modern history from Trinity College, Oxford, with First Class Honors. He continued on an English Speaking Union scholarship to Cornell University in Ithaca, New York, studying there from 1969 to 1970.

While at Cornell, Carey found out about the Javanese prince Diponegoro, who led a revolt against the Dutch colonial government in the East Indies in the 1820s. He later recalled that his interest in the prince was sparked by Diponegoro's closeness to the common people, despite his noble background.

Between 1971 and 1973 he stayed in Indonesia, completing research into Diponegoro for his doctoral thesis. He graduated in 1976, with a thesis entitled "Dipanagara and the Making of the Java War: Yogyakarta History, 1785-1825".

Carey taught at Oxford, first being elected to a Prize Fellowship at Magdalen College in 1974. He served there until 1979, when he became the Laithwaite fellow and tutor in modern history at Trinity College. In 2006, he was made a grand officer in the Order of Prince Henry the Navigator by the government of Portugal. Carey retired in 2008 and moved to Indonesia.

Carey appeared in a film, Prabowo: Sang Patriot (Prabowo: The Patriot), promoting Prabowo Subianto, a candidate in the 2014 Indonesian presidential election.  In the film, Prabowo is presented as having an illustrious family with at least two family members having assisted Diponegoro during the Java War, and Carey praises the self-sacrifice of these two ancestors. However, Carey later stated that the footage of his interview on Prabowo's ancestry had been taken from an entirely separate interview on the Java War without his permission. He then requested that Gerindra both remove his scenes, which was done, and withdraw the film, which was not. This attracted criticism. One critic claimed that Carey was "selling his soul", and another scholar asserted that Carey has a longstanding and close relationship with Prabowo, that Carey had not asked to be removed from the movie and that Carey had been vague and obfuscating and introduced irrelevancies in defending his appearance in the film. Carey responded, maintaining that his words had been taken out of context and pointing out that his original interview had not been done as a piece of political propaganda, but as an historical reflection on the impact of the Java War on Indonesian society. At no point in the original interview was any question asked about Prabowo, whom Carey only met six years later.

Carey is married to Lina Surjanti and lives in Tangerang, Banten. Aside from his continued studies into Javanese culture, Including a project to transliterate and translate the Javanese-language texts removed by the British from Yogyakarta in June 1812 under the auspices of the British Library. He once owned a wallpaper shop which has since closed down. He is currently involved in heritage issues, and co-curated the "Diponegoro Room," a permanent exhibit in the Jakarta History Museum (Museum Sejarah Jakarta, Taman Fatahillah), which was opened by the Governor of Jakarta, Anies Baswedan, on 1 April 2019.

Academic career

Carey has published on Javanese culture and history, as well as on the histories of Burma and East Timor. His "fascination" is with the 19th-century prince Diponegoro, and by 1983 he was established as "an authority on the Java War (1825-30)". He has written several books on the prince, including a translation and analysis of the Babad Dipanegara (Diponegoro Chronicles) titled Babad Dipanagara: An Account of the Outbreak of the Java War and a biography of the prince, The Power of Prophecy: Prince Dipanagara and the End of an Old Order in Java, 1785–1855. In a 2014 interview, Carey said that, "In every journey and trial Diponegoro faced, he did not lose his spirit. He still maintained his creativity and his humanity by becoming a writer, a leader, a statesman, a mystic, a clean administrator who was scrupulous in his financial dealings and benefitted the tenants and farming communities 
under his authority."

Babad Dipanagara: An Account of the Outbreak of the Java War, published in 1981, is based in part on Carey's doctoral thesis. It presents a romanised transcription of the Surakarta court version of the Babad Diponegoro, faced with an English-language translation; an Indonesian translation is included after the transcription and English text. The book opens with a 60-page introduction that discusses the manuscript and text, including a review of contemporary literature related to the Java War, and closes with 30 pages of notes, glossaries, bibliography, index and maps. Reviewing for the Bulletin of the School of Oriental and African Studies, Heather Sutherland described the book as "a pleasure to read" and a tribute to its publisher. The English used, she found, was "clear and smooth, if not poetic", and the interspersing of "valuable, scattered information" in the notes led readers to become "impatient" for a social history of Java. She concluded that the book was "exemplary", and its usefulness and origin as a "by-product of a major research effort" became "a tribute to Carey's careful scholarship and historical imagination".

The 2007 publication The Power of Prophecy: Prince Dipanagara and the End of an Old Order in Java, 1785–1855 is an almost thousand-page biography of Diponegoro, including his rarely discussed exile in Manado and Makassar. There is also extensive discussion of related topics, which both presents Carey's analysis and provides sufficient references to let readers draw their own conclusions. Amrit Gomperts, reviewing for the Bijdragen tot de Taal-, Land- en Volkenkunde, described it as "impressive", an "outstanding and authoritative study on the background of the Java War and Diponegoro's life" written in a style which "will hold the reader's attention until the last page". Gomperts differed only on the discussion of Diponegoro's adopted title Sultan Erucakra, writing that "By taking up ... the epithet of Erucakra (literally, 'arrows and discus'), Diponegoro may have intended to underline the belligerent nature of his proclaimed kingship", and emphasising that the prince had used arrows and a shield as his coat of arms.

Bibliography
 1974 The Cultural Ecology of Early Nineteenth Century Java (Singapore: Institute of South East Asian Studies / ISEAS) (Indonesian translation, Sisi Lain Diponegoro: Buku Kedung Kebo dan Historiografi Perang Jawa, Jakarta: Kepustakaan Populer Gramedia, 2017)
 1980 The Archive of Yogyakarta. Volume 1. Documents Relating to Politics and Internal Court Affairs (London: British Academy for the Oxford University Press)
 1981 Babad Dipanagara. An Account of the Outbreak of the Java War (1825–30) (Kuala Lumpur: Art Printers for the Malaysian Branch of the Royal Asiatic Society)
 1986 Maritime Southeast Asian Studies in the United Kingdom: A Survey of Their Post-War Development and Current Resources (Oxford: JASO)
 1988 With Colin Wild (ed.), Born in Fire. The Indonesian Struggle for Independence. An Anthology (Athens, Ohio: Swallow Press)
 1988 Voyage à Djokja-Karta en 1825. The Outbreak of the Java War As Seen by a Painter (Paris: Association Archipel)
 1992 The British in Java, 1811–1816. A Javanese Account (London: Oxford University Press for the British Academy) (Indonesian translation, Inggris di Jawa, 1811-1816, Jakarta: Penerbit Buku Kompas, 2017, second revised edition 2019)
 1995 With G. Carter Bentley (eds.), East Timor at the Crossroads: The Forging of a Nation (London: Cassell)
 With Steve Cox, Generations of Resistance: East Timor London: Cassell
 1997 Burma: The Challenge of Change in a Divided Society (Basingstoke: MacMillan)
 2000 With Mason C. Hoadley (eds.), The Archive of Yogyakarta, vol.2. Documents relating to Economic and Agrarian Affairs (Oxford: Oxford University Press for the British Academy)
 2007 The Power of Prophecy: Prince Dipanagara and the End of an Old Order in Java, 1785–1855, Leiden: KITLV Press  (second revised edition July 2008) (Indonesian translation: Kuasa Ramalan; Pangeran Diponegoro dan Akhir Tatanan Lama di Jawa, 1785–1855, 3 volumes, Jakarta: Kepustakaan Populer Gramedia, 2012)
 2014 Destiny: The Life of Prince Diponegoro of Yogyakarta 1785–1855 , Oxford: Peter Lang (Indonesian translation: Takdir; Riwayat Pangeran Diponegoro (1785–1855), Jakarta: Penerbit Buku Kompas)
 2021 With Farish A. Noor (eds), Racial Difference and the Colonial Wars of 19th Century Southeast Asia, Amsterdam: Amsterdam UP. (Indonesian translation Ras, Kuasa dan Kekerasan Kolonial di Hindia Belanda, 1808-1830. Jakarta: Kepustakaan Populer Gramedia, 2022)

Documentary appearances
 2010    Aung San Suu Kyi: Lady of No Fear  (Anne Gyrithe Bonne) 
 2014    Sang Patriot: Prabowo Subianto'' (Prabowo Subianto: The Patriot)

References

Works cited

External links
The Power of Prophecy at OAPEN

British historians
Living people
Historians of Southeast Asia
Fellows of Trinity College, Oxford
1948 births
Indonesianists
Academic staff of the University of Indonesia